The Kerrville Folk Festival is a music festival held for 18 consecutive days in the late spring/early summer at Quiet Valley Ranch near Kerrville, Texas. The Kerrville Folk Festival was founded in 1972 by the husband-wife team of Rod Kennedy and Nancylee Davis. The event has run annually since then. In 2002, Kennedy retired and the non-profit Texas Folk Music Foundation took over Festival management. The new board hired Dalis Allen as producer. In November 2008, the Kerrville Folk Festival and Kerrville Wine & Music Festival were acquired by the Texas Folk Music Foundation, a 501(c)3 Texas Non-profit Corporation.

The event draws around 30,000 people per year. Tickets (single day or season passes) are required for admission. Many patrons camp out on the festival grounds during part or all of the festival.

The festival places a strong emphasis on songwriting, though the performances encompass a variety of styles. The idea behind the festivals is to "promote emerging artists while giving our audience exposure to both new and recognized, seasoned talent", according to the festival's official website.

In past years, the event has also featured well known artists, including Peter, Paul and Mary, Lyle Lovett (1980), Emmylou Harris(2015), Willie Nelson(1973), Mary Chapin Carpenter, Robert Earl Keen(1983), Lucinda Williams(1974), David Crosby(2015), and Nanci Griffith(1978).

2020 saw the festival go virtual.

The Grassy Hill Kerrville New Folk Competition 
There is a yearly competition to discover promising new singer-songwriters called the New Folk Competition. Thirty-two finalists are selected from a field of 800 entries to share two of their original songs in an afternoon appearance on the stage of the Threadgill Theater.  From these 32 finalists, six winners are selected by a small group of well-established performing songwriters.  In addition to cash and other tangible prizes, the six winners are invited to the main stage to perform a 20-minute set.

A win at Kerrville carries considerable prestige in the singer-songwriter community.  This is in part due to the peer-professional judging and the festival's long history of recognizing emerging artists who have later gone on to wider success.  There have also been examples of notable performers who have appeared as finalists in the competition without ever earning a win.  Artists who have performed in the competition include:

2013 winners and finalists
The six New Folk Winners for 2013 were among 31 songwriter-finalists who performed during the New Folk Concerts on May 25 & 26, 2013 — chosen from up to 800 submissions.

2012 winners and finalists
The six New Folk Winners for 2012 were among 32 songwriter-finalists who performed during the New Folk Concerts on May 26 & 27, 2012 — chosen from 800 submissions.

2011 winners and finalists
The six New Folk Winners for 2011 were among 32 songwriter-finalists who performed during the New Folk Concerts on May 28 & 29, 2011—chosen from 800 submissions.

2010 winners and finalists
The six New Folk Winners for 2010 were among 32 songwriter-finalists who performed during the 2010 Grassy Hill Kerrville New Folk Concerts on May 29 & 30, 2010. Winners received a cash honorarium from the Texas Folk Music Foundation, Vic & Reba Heyman, and the Jim Ross Memorial Fund. They performed at the Grassy Hill Kerrville New Folk Winners Concert on Sunday, June 6, 2010.

2009 winners and finalists
The six New Folk Winners for 2009 were among 32 songwriter-finalists who performed during the 2009 Grassy Hill Kerrville New Folk Concerts on May 23 & 24, 2009. Winners received a cash honorarium from the Texas Folk Music Foundation, Vic & Reba Heyman, and the Jim Ross Memorial Fund. They performed at the Grassy Hill Kerrville New Folk Winners Concert on Sunday, May 31, 2009.

2008 winners and finalists
The six New Folk Winners for 2008 were among 32 songwriter-finalists who performed during the 2008 Grassy Hill Kerrville New Folk Concerts on May 24 & 25, 2008. Winners received a cash honorarium from the Texas Folk Music Foundation, Vic & Reba Heyman, and the Jim Ross Memorial Fund. They performed at the Grassy Hill Kerrville New Folk Winners Concert on Sunday, June 1, 2008.

2007 New Folk Competition 
The 2007 New Folk Competition was held May 26 & 27.

2006 New Folk Competition 

The 2006 New Folk Competition was held on May 27 and 28.

2005 New Folk Competition 

The 2005 New Folk Competition was held on May 28 and 29.

2004 New Folk Competition 

The 2004 Competition was held on May 29 and 30.

2003 New Folk Competition 

The 2003 Competition was held on May 24 and 25.

Kerrville Wine and Music Festival 
The Kerrville Wine & Music Festival, called "Little Folk" is also hosted by the ranch over Labor Day Weekend, and the two share a website.

List of past performers 

This list of past performers at the KFF is incomplete.
David Amram
David M. Bailey
The Belleville Outfit
Bobby Bridger
Bob Brozman
Hamilton Camp
Mary Chapin Carpenter
Guy Clark
Judy Collins
Dana Cooper
Ronny Cox
David Crosby
Rodney Crowell
Cypress Swamp Stompers
Jimmy Driftwood
Jonathan Edwards
Joe Ely
Deirdre Flint
disappear fear
Dixie Chicks
Steven Fromholz
Bob Gibson
Eliza Gilkyson
Emmylou Harris
Vince Gill (as part of Bluegrass ReVue, in 1975)
Jimmie Dale Gilmore
Nanci Griffith
Grimalkin
Butch Hancock
Patricia Hardin
Carolyn Hester
Sara Hickman
Tish Hinojosa
Ray Wylie Hubbard
Janis Ian
The Indigo Girls
Flaco Jiménez
Jitterbug Vipers
Robert Earl Keen
Tom Kimmel
Jimmy LaFave
John A. Lomax Jr.
Lyle Lovett
Mary McCaslin
Mercy River Boys
Augie Meyers
Willie Nelson
Gary P. Nunn
Odetta
Tom Paxton
Peter Paul & Mary
Shawn Phillips
Willis Alan Ramsey
Tom Prasada Rao
Gamble Rogers
Stan Rogers (died on Air Canada Flight 797 after performing in 1983)
Peter Rowan
Tom Rush
Shake Russell
Tom Russell
Peter Madcat Ruth
Don Sanders
Mike Seeger
Martin Sexton
Singing Christians
Michael Peter Smith
Bill Staines
B. W. Stevenson
Eric Taylor
Trout Fishing in America
John Vandiver
Townes Van Zandt
Jerry Jeff Walker
Susan Werner
Cheryl Wheeler
Rusty Wier
Dar Williams
Lucinda Williams
Peter Yarrow
Steve Young
The Steel Wheels
Tim York and Michael Hawthorne as T & M Express

References

External links

Official Website for the Kerrville Music Festivals
A History of New Folk Competition winners and finalists
Official Website for the Texas Folk Music Foundation
Texas State Historical Association: History of the Festival
Kerrville Kronikle, 1988-2004 on-line
Arthur Wood: An Inventory of His Papers, 1978-2015

Archival materials
 Kerrville Folk Festival records, 1958–2019, at Southwest Collection/Special Collections Library, Texas Tech University
 Arthur Wood: An Inventory of His Papers, 1988-2004, at the Southwest Collection/Special Collections Library
 Tom Frost III papers, 2000–2003, at Southwest Collection/Special Collections Library, Texas Tech University
 Southwest Regional Folk Alliance records, 1989-2017, at Southwest Collection/Special Collections Library, Texas Tech University
 Texas Heritage Music Foundation records, 1989-2017, at Southwest Collection/Special Collections Library, Texas Tech University

Music festivals established in 1972
Folk festivals in the United States
Music festivals in Texas
Tourist attractions in Kerr County, Texas
1972 establishments in Texas